was a 2G mailing and picture messaging service provided by J-Phone (now Softbank). The term derives from sha, the first part of the Japanese word , and mail (from email).

In 2002 Vodafone, which had by that point acquired J-Phone, launched Vodafone live! as a global service. This led to the now-obsolete Sha-Mail never upgrading to 3G, effectively ending Sha-Mail once support for 2G networks ceased.

The word Japanese word shamēru, often abbreviated to shame, now commonly refers to any text message with an image attached.

Mobile technology
Japanese inventions